Mangu Ram (14 January 1886 – 22 April 1980), known popularly as Babu Mangu Ram Chaudhry, was an Indian freedom fighter, a politician from Punjab and one of the founder members of the Ghadar Party.

In 1909, he immigrated to the United States and there became associated with the Ghadar Party. Upon his return to India in 1925, he became a leader of the low-caste people, organising them in opposition to the system of untouchability that oppressed them. He was instrumental in the foundation of the Ad-Dharmi Movement, an organisation dedicated to attaining equality for Untouchables. He was elected to the Punjab Legislative Assembly in 1946 and in 1972 received recognition in the form of a pension and an award from Indira Gandhi for his work towards Indian independence.

Personal life 
Mugowalia was born to Harman Dass and Atri in a Chamar family of Muggowal village, Hoshiarpur district, Punjab Province, British India. His father Harman Dass left the traditional Chamar Caste occupation of Leathercraft. His mother Atri died when he was three. Harman Dass faced discrimination at every step of his life thus did not want his son to face the same problems and enrolled him in school for early education.

Education
Initially Mangu Ram was taught by a village saint (Sadhu) till the age of seven. He attended schools in Mugowal area and Dehradun. In most of the schools Mangu ram was the only Dalit Student. He was forced to sit in back of the classroom, or even in separate room, and had to listen through the open door. 
When he attended high school in Bajwara, he was forced to stay outside the building and had to listen to the classes through the windows. 
Once when he came inside during a heavy hailstorm, the Brahman teacher beat him and put all the classroom furniture, which he had "polluted" by his presence, outside in the rain to be literally and ritually washed clean. Nonetheless, Mangu Ram was a good student, he came third in his class in primary school. While the other students were encouraged to become patwaris (village record-keeper) or to seek higher education, Mangu Ram was encouraged to leave school and help his father at a more proper "Chamar task".

Ad-Dharmi movement

 In 1925, after returning from US, Babu Mangoo Ram started teaching in a primary school in his home village of Mugowal, A school which he named Ad Dharm School. It was the same school where Babu Mangu Ram first convened the meeting that formally launched the Ad Dharam Movement. The establishment of movement was to raise their voice against the society which put Dalits at bottom of the social structure. It was the glorious step by Dalits to attain the equality in caste laden society.
Through the Ad dharm Movement, babu Mangu Ram pioneered Dalit movement in North India.

He succeeded remarkably well in creating awareness and awakening among the people. His path was beset with difficulties, and he had to work against the odds and trying circumstances. The message brought by Babu Mangu Ram was new and inspiring. It was aimed at awakening the untouchables. The message called upon them to know and realize themselves as they had forgotten their true selves due to hostile influences in which they had been living for decades . It caught imagination and hearts of downtrodden people, soon Babu Mangu Ram became household name.

Death
Mangu Ram died on 22 April 1980.

See also
Giani Ditt Singh (Sant Ditta Ram)

References

1886 births
1980 deaths
Members of the Punjab Legislative Assembly
Dalit leaders
Indian independence activists from Punjab (British India)
People from Hoshiarpur district